Poseritz is a municipality in the Vorpommern-Rügen district, in Mecklenburg-Vorpommern, Germany. The translator Christian Pistorius was born in Poseritz.

References

External links

Official website of Poseritz

Towns and villages on Rügen